Euphlyctinides is a genus of moths of the family Limacodidae.

Species
Euphlyctinides aeneola Solovyev, 2009
Euphlyctinides albifusum (Hampson, 1892)
Euphlyctinides indi Solovyev, 2009
Euphlyctinides laika Solovyev & Witt, 2009

References 

 , 2009: The Limacodidae of Vietnam. Entomofauna Supplement 16: 33-229.
 , 2009, Notes on South-East Asian Limacodidae (Lepidoptera, Zygaenoidea) with one new genus and eleven new species. Tijdschrift voor Entomology 152 (1): 167-183.

Limacodidae genera
Limacodidae
Taxa named by Erich Martin Hering